New Zealand indie electronic band The Naked and Famous have released four studio albums, two compilation albums, three extended plays, 18 singles (including one as a featured artist), seven promotional singles, 2 video albums and 16 music videos.

Albums

Studio albums

Compilation albums

Extended plays

Singles

As lead artist

As featured artist

Promotional singles

Other charting songs

Guest appearances

Remixes

Videography

Video albums

Music videos

Notes

References

External links
 
 
 
 

Alternative rock discographies
Discographies of New Zealand artists
Electronic music discographies
Rock music group discographies